Yu Ching-tang was a Taiwanese politician. He was the Vice Premier from 1963 to 1966.

Vice Premiership

Resignation
During an extraordinary session of the Standing Committee of the Central Executive Committee of the Kuomintang on 1 June 1966, Vice Premier Yu resigned from his position for health reasons and was succeeded by Huang Shao-ku.

See also
 List of vice premiers of the Republic of China

References

Political office-holders in the Republic of China on Taiwan
1890s births
1985 deaths